Englebright Dam is a  high variable radius concrete arch dam on the Yuba River in the Sacramento River Basin, located in Yuba and Nevada counties of California, United States. It was put into service in 1941 by the United States Army Corps of Engineers.

The dam was constructed in 1941 for the primary purpose of trapping sediment derived from anticipated hydraulic mining operations in the Yuba River watershed. Hydraulic mining in the Sierra Nevada was halted in 1884 but resumed on a limited basis until the 1930s during the great depression under the California Debris Commission. Although no hydraulic mining in the upper Yuba River watershed resumed after the construction of the dam, the historical mine sites continued to contribute sediment to the river. Today, Englebright Lake is used primarily for recreation and hydropower.

Englebright Lake is nestled in the scenic Sierra foothills east of Marysville. Constructed for the storage of hydraulic gold mining debris, Englebright Dam is a concrete arch structure. It spans 1,142 feet (348 m) across and is 260 feet (79 m) high. The lake is unique in that it offers boat-in camping only.

The  Englebright Reservoir provides water-based recreational benefits to the region and provides  of stored water-right capacity, which is released each year through dam operations to benefit fish downstream. Water is also diverted for regional domestic and agricultural uses. Hydroelectric generation from water stored behind Englebright produces about 294 million kilowatt hours of energy each year, or enough for the annual energy needs for 50,000 homes.

A new flow bypass system was installed in 2006 by the Yuba County Water Agency and Mitchell Engineering so that river flow requirements can be met during shut-downs of the Narrows II Powerhouse at the base of the dam.

Narrows 1 Powerhouse is further downstream and smaller than Narrows 2 Powerhouse.

See also
List of dams and reservoirs in California

References

External links
USGS dam and lake info
U.S. Army Corps of Engineers: Englegbright Lake
Yuba County Water Agency

Englebright
Dams in the Feather River basin
Yuba River
Arch dams
Buildings and structures in Nevada County, California
Buildings and structures in Yuba County, California
United States Army Corps of Engineers dams
Dams completed in 1941